YCW may refer to:

Young Christian Workers, an international Roman Catholic organization
Chilliwack Airport, the IATA airport code